Team Neusta GmbH is a private holding of Carsten Meyer-Heder. It is a computer software company headquartered in Bremen, Northern Germany. Team Neusta is one of the top-selling Internet companies in Germany. The holding owns 25 companies with several based in Germany, Toulouse, France and Lachen, Switzerland. Team Neusta employs around 1,100 people and around 500 free-lancers.

In 2018 the holding had a transaction volume of ca 170 Mio. Euro. The CEO is Heinz Kierchhoff.

The company was founded bei Carsten Meyer-Heder in 1993 as Neusta GmbH. First jobs came from the tourist company TUI and the software company Szymaniak. In March 2018, Meyer-Heder joined the conservative CDU and ran as candidate for his party for the office of the President of the Senate and Mayor of the Free Hanseatic City of Bremen in the 2019 Bremen state election. He gained 26.7% and could not reach power.

Holdings 
Because of business and tax reasons, Team Neusta runs 25 companies:

 neusta GmbH
 neusta aerospace GmbH
 neusta communications GmbH
 neusta consulting GmbH
 neusta eastern europe 
 neusta destination solutions GmbH
 neusta enterprise services GmbH
 neusta eTourism GmbH
 neusta grafenstein GmbH
 neusta identity & access management GmbH
 neusta infomantis
 neusta infrastructure services GmbH
 neusta mobile solutions GmbH
 neusta next GmbH
 neusta portal services GmbH
 neusta software development west GmbH
 neusta sport portals GmbH
neusta SAS
 neusta webservices GmbH
 HEC GmbH
 neusta experience
 neusta marketing
 eWerk GmbH
 neusta forty-two
Kurswechsel Unternehmensberatung GmbH
neusta inspire GmbH

References

Companies based in Bremen
German brands
1993 establishments in Germany